PlayStation mentality refers to the disassociation between combatants and the consequences of their actions, as a result of the use of weapon interfaces which resemble video games. 

The effect is named after the PlayStation games console, and is commonly cited in discussions of the problems of drone warfare, such as that conducted by the CIA in the Pakistan tribal areas, typically using predator drones.

See also
Depersonalization

References
http://www.channel4.com/news/cia-drone-strikes-a-legal-war

Homicide
Violence
Aggression